Thanh Nguyen (born June 18, 1964) is an American weightlifter. He competed in the men's featherweight event at the 1996 Summer Olympics.

References

1964 births
Living people
American male weightlifters
Olympic weightlifters of the United States
Weightlifters at the 1996 Summer Olympics
Sportspeople from Ho Chi Minh City